Jack Welsh (22 August 1906 – 11 November 1964) was an  Australian rules footballer who played with North Melbourne in the Victorian Football League (VFL).

Notes

External links 

1906 births
1964 deaths
Australian rules footballers from Victoria (Australia)
North Melbourne Football Club players
Geelong West Football Club players